Babubhai is a given name. Notable people with the name include:

Babubhai Bokhiria (born 1953), part of the Council of Ministers of Gujarat in 13th Gujarat Legislative Assembly of the Indian state of Gujarat
Babubhai Maneklal Chinai, Indian politician
Babubhai Desai, Member of Legislative assembly and a Best MLA Award Winner from Kankrej constituency in Gujarat for its 12th legislative assembly
Babubhai Khimabhai Katara (born 1961), member of the 14th Lok Sabha of India until suspended
Babubhai Mehta, writer of stories for Bollywood Hindi films
Babubhai Mistry (1918–2010), Indian film director and special effects pioneer who is best known for his films based on Hindu mythology
Babubhai J. Patel, the chief minister of Gujarat state in India
Babubhai Patel (cricketer) (born 1911), Indian cricketer
Babubhai Patel (politician), member of Gujarat Legislative Assembly from Daskroi constituency in Ahmedabad district of Gujarat
Narendra Babubhai Patel, KT, FMedSci, FRSE (born 1938), British obstetrician, cross bench peer, former Chancellor of the University of Dundee
Babubhai Thiba (born 1950), Indian film producer, consultant and a Celebrity Manager and is primarily known for his work in Hindi films
Babubhai P. Vaidya (1909–1979), Indian freedom-fighter, author, journalist, and champion of human rights
Vaja Babubhai, Member of Legislative Assembly representing the Mangrol assembly constituency in the Gujarat Legislative Assembly, India

See also